Everton Judson Conger (April 25, 1834 – July 12, 1918) was an American officer during the Civil War who was instrumental in the capture of John Wilkes Booth, the assassin of President Abraham Lincoln, in a Virginia barn twelve days after Lincoln was shot.

Biography
Everton Conger was born in Huron County, Ohio, in 1834.  He was the son of Rev. Enoch Conger, a Presbyterian minister. In 1856, he moved to Fremont, Ohio, where he established a dental practice.

Conger enlisted in the Union army during the Civil War, initially as a private in the three-months 8th Ohio Infantry. When his term of enlistment expired, he returned to Fremont. On October 16, 1861, he married Emma "Kate" Boren, with whom he had five children. He later became a captain in the 3rd West Virginia Cavalry and eventually rose to the rank of lieutenant colonel of the 1st District of Columbia Cavalry.  He suffered three severe wounds during combat and was assigned to detached duty in Washington, D.C., joining General Lafayette Baker's intelligence service as a detective.

Following the assassination of President Lincoln on April 14, 1865, Conger was ordered to accompany a detachment of 25 Union soldiers from the 16th New York Cavalry Regiment, led by Lieutenant Edward P. Doherty. The soldiers pursued Booth through Southern Maryland and across the Potomac and Rappahannock rivers to Richard Garrett's farm, just south of Port Royal, Caroline County, Virginia. Booth and his accomplice, David E. Herold, had been led to the farm by William Storke "Willie" Jett, formerly a private in the 9th Virginia Cavalry, whom they had met before crossing the Rappahannock.

Conger tracked down Jett and interrogated him, learning of Booth's location at the Garrett farm, and led the soldiers there. Arriving early in the morning of April 26, 1865, the soldiers found Booth and Herold hiding in a tobacco barn. Although Herold surrendered, Booth refused.

Conger set fire to the barn and Sergeant Boston Corbett mortally wounded Booth by shooting him in the neck. Booth was dragged from the barn and died on the porch of the Garrett farmhouse.

Conger removed Booth's personal effects, including a diary.  Conger was given $15,000 as a reward for the successful operation. The city of Fremont gave him a pair of inscribed silver-handled pistols in recognition for his role in tracking down Booth.

Conger moved to Illinois, built a home, and practiced law in Carmi.  Later he was appointed a United States District Court judge in the Montana Territory.  He eventually moved to Hawaii to live with his daughter, dying there in 1918.  He was buried in Montana.

See also

Edward P. Doherty

Notes

External links
White County, Illinois Personalities and Famous People
Six Generations of the Family of Job Conger and Mary Keziah Thorp
Rutherford B. Hayes library

1834 births
1918 deaths
Illinois lawyers
Montana Territory judges
Union Army colonels
People associated with the assassination of Abraham Lincoln
People from Huron County, Ohio
People from Carmi, Illinois
People of Ohio in the American Civil War
People of West Virginia in the American Civil War
People from Fremont, Ohio
19th-century American judges